John Cameron Brown (born 1843) was a civil engineer and political figure in New Brunswick, Canada. He represented Charlotte County in the Legislative Assembly of New Brunswick from 1872 to 1874 as a Liberal member.

He was born at Tower Hill in Charlotte County near St. Andrews, the son of James Brown and Catherine Gillespie (née Cameron). He worked on the construction of a number of railways including the Intercolonial Railway. Brown was elected to the provincial assembly in an 1872 by-election held after John McAdam was elected to the House of Commons.

References 
The Canadian parliamentary companion HJ Morgan (1874)

1843 births
Year of death missing
New Brunswick Liberal Association MLAs